Siripong Kongjaopha (born February 4, 1997) is a Thai professional footballer who plays as a defensive midfielder for Thai League 3 club Dragon Pathumwan Kanchanaburi.

Honours

Clubs
Dragon Pathumwan Kanchanaburi
Thai League 3 Western Region: 2022–23

References

External links
 

1997 births
Living people
Siripong Kongjaopha
Association football midfielders
Siripong Kongjaopha
Siripong Kongjaopha